Music for the Fifth World is an album by Jack DeJohnette, featuring performances with Will Calhoun, Michael Cain, Vernon Reid, Lonnie Plaxico and John Scofield plus vocalists, recorded in 1992 and released on the Manhattan label in 1993.

Reception 
The AllMusic review by Scott Yanow states, "The music is stimulating if not as essential as DeJohnette's earlier work with Special Edition". A JazzTimes reviewer selected it in 2012 as one of DeJohnette's key albums and described it as an "ambitious homage to Native American culture".

Track listing 
All compositions by Jack DeJohnette except as indicated
 "Fifth World Anthem" - 9:27  
 "Dohiyi Circle No. 1"  (Joan Henry) - 2:56  
 "Miles" - 8:15  
 "Two Guitar Chant/Dohiyi (DeJohnette, Henry) - 5:16  
 "Deception Blues" - 4:55  
 "Witchi-Tai-To" (Jim Pepper additional lyrics by Henry) - 6:11  
 "Darkness to Light" - 12:34  
 "Dohiyi Circle No. 2" (Henry) - 2:25  
 "Aboriginal Dream Time" - 8:10  
 Recorded at Clinton Studios, N.Y in February, 1992

Personnel 
 Jack DeJohnette – drums, vocals, ceremonial drum, keyboards, keyboard bass, synthesizer, percussion 
 Vernon Reid – guitar, vocals
 John Scofield – guitar
 Will Calhoun – drums, vocals, ceremonial drum
 Lonnie Plaxico – bass
 Michael Cain – piano, synthesizer
 Robert Rosario – vocals, ceremonial drum
 Denis Yerry – ceremonial drum
 Joan Henry – percussion, vocals
 Farah DeJohnette, Ethel Calhoun – vocals

References 

Jack DeJohnette albums
1993 albums